Think of Me is a 1996 Cuban drama film directed by Arturo Sotto Díaz. The film was selected as the Cuban entry for the Best Foreign Language Film at the 69th Academy Awards, but was not accepted as a nominee.

Cast
 Fernando Hechevarria
 Osvaldo Doimeadios
 Susana Perez
 Carlos Acosta-Milian
 Jorge Alí
 Rubén Breñas
 Óscar Bringas
 Micheline Calvert
 Juan Cepero

See also
 List of submissions to the 69th Academy Awards for Best Foreign Language Film
 List of Cuban submissions for the Academy Award for Best Foreign Language Film

References

External links
 

1996 films
1996 drama films
Cuban drama films
1990s Spanish-language films